The Soda Mountain Wilderness is a protected wilderness area inside the Cascade–Siskiyou National Monument located in the U.S. state of Oregon adjacent to the California state border. The wilderness area was created by the Omnibus Public Land Management Act of 2009, which was signed into law by President Barack Obama on March 30, 2009. The wilderness encompasses many mountains, including Boccard Point.

See also
 List of Oregon Wildernesses
 List of U.S. Wilderness Areas
 Wilderness Act

References

External links
 Soda Mountain Wilderness - Oregon Wild
 Soda Mountain Wilderness Area - BLM page

Protected areas of Jackson County, Oregon
Wilderness areas of Oregon
Protected areas established in 2009
2009 establishments in Oregon